The İzmir Football League was founded as a regional football league for İzmir based clubs in 1924. In the period from 1924 to 1935, the winners of the İzmir League qualified for the former Turkish Football Championship. In 1937 the first national league in Turkish football was introduced. The top two placed teams of the İzmir League qualified for the National Division, which took place after the conclusion of the regional leagues each season. The name of the league was changed later and became İzmir Professional Football League in the 1955–56 season, when professional football was introduced. 

The league continued to be played after 1959, though it was no longer a first level competition since the professional nationwide league was introduced in 1959. Altay are the most successful club in league history, having won a record 14 championship titles.

Participated teams
The following teams participated in the league regularly for at least a few years: 
 Altay
 Karşıyaka
 Altınordu
 İzmirspor (founded by Sakarya and Altın Ay)
 Göztepe
 İzmir Demirspor
 Kayagücü
 Menemen İdman Ocağı (later to become Menemenspor)
 Bayraklı
 Egespor (formerly Şarkspor)
 Bucaspor
 Bornova
 Yün Pamuk Mensucat
 Kültürspor
 Ülküspor
 Üçokspor (temporary merger between Altay, Altınordu, and Bucaspor)
 Doğanspor (temporary merger between Göztepe, İzmirspor, and Egespor)

Champions

Source: 

1 Alliance between Altay, Altınordu, and Yüce.
2 Alliance between Göztepe, İzmirspor, and Egespor.

Performance by club 

 1 Includes Sakarya

External links
 İzmir League final tables

References

Sources

Defunct football leagues in Turkey
Sport in İzmir
1924 establishments in Turkey
1959 disestablishments in Turkey
Sports leagues established in 1924